Körsch (in its upper course: Sindelbach) is a river of Baden-Württemberg, Germany. It is a left tributary of the Neckar at Deizisau.

It is the second largest waterbody in Stuttgart and is formed at the  convergence of the right Sindelbach and the left Aischbach in Stuttgart-Möhringen. After almost 27 km on the Filder it flows into the Neckar between Esslingen am Neckar and Deizisau.

See also
List of rivers of Baden-Württemberg

References

Rivers of Baden-Württemberg
Rivers of Germany